Melnik, Melnick or Melnyk (Russian or Ukrainian: Мельник; Belarusian: Мельнік) is a gender-neutral Slavic occupational surname literally meaning "miller". The surname may refer to:

Association football
Bohdan Melnyk (born 1997), Ukrainian football midfielder 
Ihor Melnyk (disambiguation) – multiple footballers 
Ivan Melnik (born 1991), Russian football forward
Oleksandr Melnyk (born 2000), Ukrainian football defender
Roman Melnik (born 1977), Russian football forward
Serhiy Melnyk (disambiguation) – multiple footballers 
 Vadym Melnyk (born 1980), Ukrainian football defender
 Viktor Melnyk (born 1980), Ukrainian football defender

Other sportspeople
Boris Melnik (1945–2016), Soviet sports shooter
Evgenia Melnik (born 1988), Belarusian figure skater
 Faina Melnyk (1945–2016), Ukrainian discus thrower
Galina Melnik (born 1970), Russian table tennis player
 Gerry Melnyk (1934–2001), Canadian ice hockey forward
 Larry Melnyk (born 1960), Canadian ice hockey defenceman
Olga Melnik (born 1974), Russian biathlete
 Steve Melnyk (born 1947), American golfer
Tetyana Melnyk (born 1995), Ukrainian sprinter and hurdler
Vitaliy Melnik, Soviet luger
Yona Melnik (born 1949), Israeli judoka

Business, politics
 Andriy Melnyk (disambiguation) – several people
Christine Melnick (born 1950), Canadian politician
Emma of Mělník (died 1005/06), Bohemian duchess
 Eugene Melnyk (1959–2022), Canadian businessman and owner of the Ottawa Senators
John L. Melnick (1935–2013), Virginia lawyer and Democratic politician
 Joseline Peña-Melnyk (born 1966), American politician 
 Nicholas Melnyk (1912–1973), Canadian politician 
 Stanislav Melnyk (1961–2015), Ukrainian politician
Valentyna Melnyk (born 1978), New Zealand marketing academic

Fiction
Danielle Melnick, fictional character on the television series Law & Order
Herb Melnick, fictional character on the television series Two and a Half Men

Music, films, literature and other media
Aleksandr Melnik (1958–2021), Russian film director
Allison Melnick (born 1971), American socialite and reality TV star
Ashley Melnick (born 1989), American beauty pageant contestant
 Cameron Melnyk, lead singer for Canadian rock band State of Shock
Daniel Melnick (1932–2009), American film producer
David Melnick (born 1938), American poet
Elena Melnik (born 1986), Russian fashion model
Ion Melnik (born 1935), Russian music composer
 Jeff Melnyk, Canadian electronic music producer
Lola Melnick (born 1982), Russian dancer, TV presenter and actress
 Lubomyr Melnyk (born 1948), composer and pianist of Ukrainian origin
Mykhailo Melnyk (1944–1979), Ukrainian historian and poet
Mitch Melnick (born 1959), Canadian radio sports announcer
Natasha Melnick (born 1984), American actress
Peter Rodgers Melnick (born 1958), American composer
Yaroslav Melnyk (born 1959), Ukrainian/Lithuanian novelist, philosopher, and critic

Pilots
Bruce E. Melnick (born 1949), American pilot and astronaut 
Mykola Melnyk (1953–2013), Soviet-Ukrainian pilot

Science, medicine
Anton Melnyk, Ukrainian computer programmer 
Don Melnick (born 1953), American biologist
George Melnyk, Canadian historian, academic, and writer
Joseph L. Melnick (1914–2001), American epidemiologist
Roderick Melnik, Canadian-Australian mathematician
Tatiana Botkina-Melnik (1898–1986), Russian nurse, daughter of Eugene Botkin
Vijaya Melnick (born 1937), American biologist
Volodymyr Melnyk (born 1952), Ukrainian academic and philosopher

References

See also
 
 

Belarusian-language surnames
Russian-language surnames
Ukrainian-language surnames
Occupational surnames